Keanu Pinder (born 28 May 1995) is an Australian professional basketball player for Fuenlabrada of the Liga ACB.

Early life and career 
Pinder was born in Derby, Western Australia, to an Indigenous Australian mother from the Kimberley region and a Bahamian father. He grew up in Perth where his father, Kendal, played professionally for the Perth Wildcats in the National Basketball League. Pinder played both basketball and Australian rules football until his teenage years when he decided to focus on basketball solely. He attended Chisholm Catholic College in Perth before transferring to Sunrise Christian Academy in Wichita, Kansas, for his senior year.

Pinder was a member of the Lakeside Lightning in 2013 when they won the State Basketball League (SBL) championship. He had a short stint with the East Perth Eagles during the 2015 SBL season.

College career
Pinder began his college career with Hutchinson Community College in 2014 before switching to the University of Arizona in 2016. As a senior in 2017–18, he averaged 2.4 points and 2.3 rebounds in 10.4 minutes per game.

Professional career
After graduating from college, Pinder moved to Poland where he played two seasons for Legia Warszawa in the PLK. He averaged 7.1 points, 5.7 rebounds, and 1.3 assists per game in the 2019–20 season.

On 17 July 2020, Pinder signed with the Adelaide 36ers for the 2020–21 NBL season. He averaged 4.8 points and 4.3 rebounds in 35 games in his first NBL season.

On 19 July 2021, Pinder signed a two-year deal with the Cairns Taipans. He averaged 10.9 points and 7.6 rebounds in 28 games during the 2021–22 season, as he won the NBL Most Improved Player Award. In the 2022 off-season, he played for the Northside Wizards of the NBL1 North. In 2022–23, he averaged 16.9 points and 9.3 rebounds in 19 games before injury cut his season short. He was subsequently named NBL Most Improved Player for the second straight year, becoming the first player in league history to win the award twice.

On 3 March 2023, Pinder signed with Fuenlabrada of the Liga ACB.

National team career
Pinder represented Australia for the first time at the 2013 FIBA Under-19 World Championship in the Czech Republic.

In 2015, Pinder played for the Australian University National Team at the World University Games in South Korea.

In 2022, Pinder won gold with the Boomers at the FIBA Asia Cup in Indonesia.

References

External links

NBL profile
Arizona Wildcats bio

1995 births
Living people
Adelaide 36ers players
Arizona Wildcats men's basketball players
Australian expatriate basketball people in Poland
Australian expatriate basketball people in the United States
Australian men's basketball players
Australian people of Bahamian descent
Basketball players from Perth, Western Australia
Cairns Taipans players
Centers (basketball)
Hutchinson Blue Dragons men's basketball players
Indigenous Australian basketball players
Legia Warsaw (basketball) players